

Seeds

Draw

External links
Draw

Kremlin Cup
Kremlin Cup